Misanthropic Carnage is the second studio album released by the death metal band Severe Torture in 2002. It was recorded at Franky's Recording Kitchen in The Netherlands with producers Berthus Westerhuys and Robbie Woning.

Track listing 
Mutilation Of The Flesh - 03:14
Meant To Suffer - 04:05
Carnivorous Force - 02:48
Misanthropic Carnage - 04:33
Blinded I Slaughter - 03:54
Impelled To Kill - 01:58
Castrated - 04:40
Forever To Burn - 01:42
Your Blood Is Mine - 05:25

Personnel
Dennis Schreurs – vocals 
Thijs van Laarhoven – guitar 
Patrick Boleij – bass 
Seth van de Loo – drums

Severe Torture albums
2002 albums
Hammerheart Records albums